The following is a list of buildings at Brown University. Five buildings are listed with the United States Department of the Interior's National Register of Historic Places: University Hall (1770), Nightingale–Brown House (1792), Gardner House (1806), Corliss–Brackett House (1887), and the Ladd Observatory (1891).

Academic Facilities

Administrative Buildings

Libraries

Residential Buildings

Residence Halls

East Campus
The East Campus was originally the main campus location of Brown's former neighbor Bryant College. Brown purchased Bryant's campus in 1969 for $5.0 million when the latter school moved to a new campus in Smithfield, Rhode Island. This added  of land adjacent to Brown's existing campus. In 1971, the area formerly occupied by Bryant was officially designated as East Campus.

Keeney Quadrangle
Keeney Quadrangle (originally named West Quadrangle) opened in 1957 as, in the words of President Barnaby Keeney, a place "to provide a dignified and happy home for the independents." The quadrangle was dedicated to Keeney in 1982.

Containing 6 houses, the quadrangle houses approximately 585 students.

Main Campus

Pembroke Campus

Wriston Quadrangle
Wriston Quadrangle, built from 1950 to 1952, consists of 9 residential buildings bordered by George Street, Thayer Street, Charlesfield Street, and Brown Street. Fifty-one buildings in total were razed to make space for the development. The buildings were designed to house a fraternity on each end of the building, with independents living in the rooms in between.

At the time the quad was built, many (though not all) of the University's fraternities were in financial trouble and membership numbers struggled due to the limited number of civilian students on campus (much of the University's housing at the time was used for students in the Armed Forces training program). In return for University housing in Wriston Quadrangle, the fraternities were compelled to deed their privately owned houses (many in disrepair) to the University.

The quad still houses the majority of the University's fraternities, sororities, and program houses.

Rental Properties
Brown owns many properties that it leases to others for various purposes.

Jewelry District

Additional Facilities

Parking structures

Commercial Properties
Brown University owns several properties that are not yet used to support the institution's mission. These properties are leased to businesses until such time that the University expands into the buildings.

Athletic Facilities

Vacant Properties

See also
 List of Brown University statues

References

Brown
Buildings
Brown University